Deqadi (also, Degady and Digadi) is a village and municipality in the Astara Rayon of Azerbaijan.  It has a population of 722.  The municipality consists of the villages of Deqadi and Səliva.

References 

Populated places in Astara District